Angular may refer to:

Anatomy
 Angular artery, the terminal part of the facial artery
 Angular bone, a large bone in the lower jaw of amphibians and reptiles
 Angular incisure, a small anatomical notch on the stomach
 Angular gyrus, a region of the brain in the parietal lobe
 Angular vein, formed by the junction of the frontal vein and supraorbital vein

Other uses
 Angular (web framework), an open-source web platform
AngularJS, the first incarnation of Angular
 Angle, having an angle or angles
 Angular diameter, describing how large a sphere or circle appears from a given point of view
 Angular diameter distance, used in astronomy
 Angular Recording Corporation, a British independent record label

See also
 Angle (disambiguation)